Derbyshire County Cricket Club in 1926 represents the cricket season when the English club Derbyshire had been playing for fifty five years. It was their twenty-eighth season in the County Championship and they won five matches to finish eleventh in the County Championship.

1926 season

Derbyshire played 24 games in the County Championship, and one match against the touring Australians. The majority of matches were drawn, and Derbyshire suffered heavy defeats at the hands of champion county Lancashire.

Guy Jackson was in his fifth season as captain. Harry Storer was top scorer and took 41 wickets as well. Stan Worthington took most wickets with 56.

Neville Ford played the first of several seasons for Derbyshire but William Parrington appeared only in 1926. Henry Jordan played in just one match without scoring, while Albert Blount reappeared for two matches twelve years after he had last played for the county. Stalwarts Samuel Cadman and Arthur Morton played their last games for the club.

Matches

{| class="wikitable" style="width:100%;"
|-
! style="background:#efefef;" colspan="6"| List of matches
|- style="background:#efefef;"
!No.
!Date
!V
!Result 
!Margin
!Notes
|- 
|1
|8 May 1926  
| Yorkshire  Rutland Recreation Ground, Ilkeston 
| style="background:#fc0;"|Drawn
|
| Macaulay 6–34 
|- 
|2
| 15 May 1926  
|Lancashire  Old Trafford, Manchester  
| style="background:#f00;"|Lost
|Innings and 214 runs
| Hallows 110 
|- 
|3
| 22 May 1926  
| Warwickshire  County Ground, Derby 
| style="background:#fc0;"|Drawn
|
| Bates 187; Partridge 5–77 
|- 
|4
| 26 May 1926  
| Northamptonshire  County Ground, Northampton 
| style="background:#fc0;"|Drawn
|
| Jupp 109; H Storer 5–46 
|- 
|5
| 29 May 1926
| Glamorgan   Queen's Park, Chesterfield 
| style="background:#f00;"|Lost
|8 wickets
| Bates 100; Mercer 5–50 
|- 
|6
| 5 Jun 1926  
| Essex County Ground, Derby 
| style="background:#f00;"|Lost
|Innings and 153 runs
| Freeman 172; AHM Jackson 5–84; Palmer 5–31 
|- 
|7
| 9 Jun 1926
| Kent  Garrison 1 Cricket Ground, Chatham 
| style="background:#fc0;"|Drawn
|
| Hardinge 134; Freeman 5–82; Wright 5–36 
|- 
|8
|12 Jun 1926  
| Leicestershire  Queen's Park, Chesterfield  
|Abandoned
|
|  
|- 
|9
| 19 Jun 1926  
| Gloucestershire  The Town Ground, Burton-on-Trent 
| style="background:#fc0;"|Drawn
|
|Dipper 118  
|- 
|10
| 23 Jun 1926
|Australians  Queen's Park, Chesterfield  
| style="background:#fc0;"|Drawn
|
| Bardsley 127 
|- 
|11
| 26 Jun 1926
| Somerset  Recreation Ground, Bath 
| style="background:#f00;"|Lost
|Innings and 1 run
| Bridges 5–59; Hunt 5–90 
|- 
|12
| 30 Jun 1926  
| Gloucestershire  Greenbank, Bristol 
| style="background:#0f0;"|Won
|6 wickets
 | GM Lee 5–89; Sinfield 5–80   
|- 
|13
|3 Jul 1926  
| Glamorgan   Ynysangharad Park, Pontypridd 
| style="background:#fc0;"|Drawn
|
| Riches 136; H Storer 5–90 
|- 
|14
| 10 Jul 1926  
| Somerset   County Ground, Derby 
| style="background:#0f0;"|Won
|139 runs
| H Storer 132 and 6–48; Bridges 5–120
|- 
|15
| 14 Jul 1926  
| Yorkshire  Bramall Lane, Sheffield 
| style="background:#fc0;"|Drawn
|
 |  
|- 
|16
|17 Jul 1926  
| Leicestershire  Aylestone Road, Leicester 
| style="background:#f00;"|Lost
|Innings and 51 runs
| Taylor 107; Lord 5–40; GM Lee 5–57 
|- 
|17
| 24 Jul 1926  
|Lancashire  Queen's Park, Chesterfield  
| style="background:#f00;"|Lost
|Innings and 150 runs
| Hallows 100; Watson 109; Tyldesley 5–17 and 5–18 
|- 
|18
| 28 Jul 1926  
| Worcestershire  Rutland Recreation Ground, Ilkeston
| style="background:#0f0;"|Won
|2 wickets
| Fox 105; Root 5–56 and 6–83; A Morton 5–44  
|- 
|19
|31 Jul 1926  
| Warwickshire  Edgbaston, Birmingham 
| style="background:#fc0;"|Drawn
|
| J Bowden 106; W Quaife 5–81; GM Lee 6–76 
|- 
|20
| 4 Aug 1926  
| Worcestershire  Chester Road North Ground, Kidderminster 
| style="background:#0f0;"|Won
|83 runs
| Fox 141; Wilson 5–97 and 5–74; A Morton 5–71 
|- 
|21
| 7 Aug 1926  
|  Nottinghamshire Trent Bridge, Nottingham 
| style="background:#fc0;"|Drawn
|
| Payton 133; H Larwood 5–44; Richmond 5–98 
|- 
|22
| 11 Aug 1926  
| Essex County Ground, Leyton 
| style="background:#fc0;"|Drawn
|
| Russell 102*; A Morton 5–94 
|- 
|23
| 14 Aug 1926  
|  Nottinghamshire Rutland Recreation Ground, Ilkeston  
| style="background:#f00;"|Lost
|50 runs
 | Payton 100*; Staples 5–76 and 6–51; Richmond 5–78; L F Townsend 6–32 
|- 
|24
|18 Aug 1926  
|  Northamptonshire  Queen's Park, Chesterfield  
| style="background:#0f0;"|Won
|Innings and 69 runs
| L F Townsend 5–14; Jupp 5–98 
|- 
|25
| 21 Aug 1926  
| Kent  County Ground, Derby 
| style="background:#fc0;"|Drawn
|
| GM Lee 191 and 5–87; T S Worthington 5–74; Freeman 6–120 
|- 
|

Statistics

County Championship batting averages

County Championship bowling averages

Wicket-keeper

H Elliott Catches 35 Stumping 12

See also
Derbyshire County Cricket Club seasons
1926 English cricket season

References

1926 in English cricket
Derbyshire County Cricket Club seasons
English cricket seasons in the 20th century